Amorphous semiconductor may refer to :
 Amorphous silicon (e.g. for thin-film PV)
 glassy forms of Arsenic sulfide
 glassy selenium
 glassy tellurium
 glassy Boron
 glassy Germanium

   

 Semiconductor#Amorphous semiconductor